I32 may refer to:
 , a V-class destroyer of the Royal Navy
 , a B1 type submarine of the Imperial Japanese Navy 
 Morehead-Rowan County Airport, in Rowan County, Kentucky; closed
 i32, a name for the 32-bit signed integer, especially in Rust